NeoHunter is a video game developed by American studio Ronin Entertainment and published by Virgin Interactive for MS-DOS and Windows in 1996.

Gameplay
NeoHunter is an action game with a cyberpunk theme, and dialogue written by author Orson Scott Card.

Reception
Next Generation reviewed the PC version of the game, rating it one star out of five, and stated that "This is an awful game. Look at the box, you might not think so. [...] But don't be fooled."

Reviews
PC Player (Germany) - Jan, 1997
Computer Gaming World - Mar, 1997
Computer Games Magazine - 1996

References

1996 video games
Action video games
Cyberpunk video games
DOS games
Multiplayer and single-player video games
Ronin Entertainment games
Video games developed in the United States
Virgin Interactive games
Windows games
Works by Orson Scott Card